Joshua Schoenfeld (born 3 July 1997) is a former Australian rules footballer who played for the Gold Coast Football Club in the Australian Football League (AFL). He was drafted by the Gold Coast Football Club with their third selection and thirty-fourth overall in the 2015 national draft. 

He made his debut in the twenty-four point win against  in round 18, 2016 at Metricon Stadium. He kicked his first goal against the Brisbane Lions in Round 1 of the 2017 season. Schoenfeld was delisted by the Suns at the conclusion of the 2019 AFL season, but he was re-drafted in the 2019 Rookie Draft. He was again delisted at the end of the 2020 season, and returned to Western Australia to play for East Fremantle in the West Australian Football League (WAFL). He was selected to represent Western Australia in the interstate match against South Australia in 2021.

References

External links

 

1997 births
Living people
Gold Coast Football Club players
Australian rules footballers from Western Australia
East Fremantle Football Club players